Mladé Bříště is a municipality and village in Pelhřimov District in the Vysočina Region of the Czech Republic. It has about 300 inhabitants.

Administrative parts
Villages of Hojkovy and Záhoří are administrative parts of Mladé Bříště.

References

Villages in Pelhřimov District